Armstrong/Waweig Lake Water Aerodrome  was located  south southwest of Armstrong, Thunder Bay District, Ontario, Canada.

See also
Armstrong Airport
Armstrong Water Aerodrome

References

Transport in Thunder Bay District
Defunct seaplane bases in Ontario